Manhunt refers to a number of variations of the game of tag. The goal is to avoid being tagged by anyone designated as "it" or (for those already "it") to tag anyone who has not been tagged. It is played in the dark. Some variations include teams and point scoring. In some variants flashlights are used. Other variants on manhunt include Takedown manhunt and Buildup Manhunt. In the Takedown manhunt version the player tagged "IT" will need to bring the player down to the ground often with force in order for it to be counted as a tag. In the Build up variant, the game starts as any normal game, but instead of players who have been captured waiting out the game they will join the hunter and also become "it" themselves.

See also
 Ringolevio
 Wide Game

References

External links
 Manhunt Edmonton
 Manhunt Halifax
 Manhunt Ljubljana
 Manhunt Toronto
 Manhunt Warsaw
 Manhunt Vancouver
 Manhunt Victoria

Street games
Pervasive games
Tag variants